Fishboy may refer to:

Fishboy (band), an American indie pop band from Denton, Texas
Fishboy (comic), a British comic story
In the horror movie House of 1000 Corpses, Fishboy is the title given by the character Otis B. Driftwood for his sadistic sculpture, which combines the upper body of a human with a large fish tail.